Cigarette packets in Australia have undergone significant changes. Since 1 December 2012, all forms of branding logos, colours, and promotional texts are banned from cigarette pack designs. In turn they were replaced with drab dark brown packets (Pantone 448 C) and graphic images of smoking-related images to try to reduce the smoking population of Australia to 10% by 2018 from 15% in 2012.

In addition to other public health measures, packaging requirements have further decreased the prevalence and uptake of smoking, and have reduced cigarette sales in Australia.

History
In 1973, Australia's first health warning on cigarette packages appeared with the simple message 'WARNING — SMOKING IS A HEALTH HAZARD'. Since 1 March 2006, graphic images depicting the effects of smoking cigarettes have been required to be displayed on cigarette packets. Warnings must cover 30% of the front and 90% of the back of the box. The 10% of the back not occupied by a warning is used for the message "Sale to underage persons prohibited".

Since 1 December 2012 all forms of branding logos, colours, and promotional texts are banned from cigarette pack designs. The requirement is for plain cigarette packaging showing only brand name and health warning messages. Australia was the first country to have plain packaging cigarette packs. At the same time the plain packets were introduced, the size of the anti-smoking images became larger, so the two effects are difficult to separate.

Canada was the first country to use graphic pictures in conjunction with written warnings on cigarette packages, with the legislation coming in 2000.

Development around the world

Following Australia's lead a number of other countries also require standardized packaging including France (applies to cigarettes sold after 1 January 2017), United Kingdom (21 May 2017), New Zealand (6 June 2018), Norway (1 July 2018) and Ireland (1 October 2018).

France and the United Kingdom are, respectively, the second and third country to have introduced plain tobacco packaging after Australia.

As a result of the enactment of the December 2015 plain tobacco packaging bill, on 1 January 2017 France became the second country in the world, after Australia, and the first in the European Union to require tobacco products to be sold in plain packaging.

In March 2015, the House of Commons voted 367–113 in favour of plain cigarette packaging in the United Kingdom. The sale of plain packs is compulsory since 21 May 2017.

Warnings

For cigarette packets, warnings include:

 Smoking causes peripheral vascular disease
 Smoking causes emphysema
 Smoking causes mouth and throat cancer
 Smoking clogs your arteries
 Don't let children breathe your smoke

 Smoking - A leading cause of death
 Quitting will improve your health
 Smoking harms unborn babies
 Smoking causes blindness
 Smoking causes lung cancer

 Smoking causes heart disease
 Smoking doubles your risk of stroke
 Smoking is addictive
 Tobacco smoke is toxic

With each warning is an accompanying graphic, and detailed information on the back of the packet. In addition, cigar and loose tobacco packets show other, slightly altered warnings. These warnings target the misconception that alternative, non-cigarette tobacco products are less harmful.

There have been calls to expand the range of warnings to reflect current research into the effects of smoking, such as impacts on fertility.

Australian cigarette packaging laws also prohibit the use of terms such as 'light', 'mild', 'extra mild', etc. The three major Australian tobacco manufacturers agreed to stop using these terms, after investigation of complaints of misleading and deceptive terms were made to the Australian Competition & Consumer Commission (ACCC) in 2005. This has assisted in counteracting the belief that some cigarette varieties are less harmful than others. To the same effect, while the carbon monoxide, nicotine and tar content of particular brands of cigarettes used to be mandated, the display and/or advertisement these figures is now prohibited under the government's "All Cigarettes are Toxic" campaign.

In 2014, an population-wide, interrupted time-series analysis concludes there was a significant increase of calls to Quitline in some states not attributable to other factors that would suggest plain packaging might encourage smokers to attempt or at least seek help with quitting smoking.

In 2018, the World Trade Organization (WTO) Panel Report on Australia's Tobacco Plain Packaging (TPP) policy determined that "there is some econometric evidence suggesting that the TPP measures, in combination with the enlarged GHWs implemented at the same time, contributed to the reduction in wholesale cigarette sales, and therefore cigarette consumption, after their entry into force" and that, overall, the decrease in cigarette sales accelerated after TPP measures based on a review of the evidence regarding tobacco sales.

In 2020, an World Trade Organization Appellate Body (WTOAB) assessment of the Panel's findings upheld the findings of the Panel regarding the effect of TPP on reducing smoking prevalence and cigarette consumption, concluding that "while the appellants may disagree with the Panel's review of the factual evidence, as well as its conclusion, the Panel's explanation for how it reviewed the evidence and its reasons for its ultimate conclusion are quite clearly expressed. There is no doubt, in our view, about how and why the Panel concluded that "[t]he downward trend in cigarette sales in Australia appears to have accelerated in the post-TPP period."

See also

Plain tobacco packaging
Tobacco packaging warning messages
Health effects of tobacco
Tobacco advertising
Cigarette pack
Pantone 448C

References

2012 in Australia
Cigarette packaging
Smoking in Australia
Gillard Government